Greatest Hits Live is a live album by American band Earth, Wind & Fire issued in 1996 on Rhino Records.

Overview
Greatest Hits Live was recorded at Velfarre, Tokyo, Japan.
The album was previously issued as Plugged in Live and Live in Velfarre.

Critical reception

Leo Stanley of Allmusic gave a 2.5 out of 5 stars rating calling the album "a fun performance for dedicated fans". With a 4.5 out of 5 stars rating Bob Jones of Muzik described Greatest Hits Live  as "a faultless collection."

Track listing 
Adapted from album's text.

Personnel
Adapted from album's text.

Philip Bailey: Percussion, vocals
Ray Brown: Trumpet
Carl Carlwell: Vocals
Sonny Emory: Drums
Scott Mayo: Saxophone
Mike McKnight: Keyboards
Morris Pleasure: Keyboards
Sheldon Reynolds: Guitar, vocals
David Romero: Percussion
Maurice White: Kalimba, percussion, vocals
Verdine White: Bass
Reggie C. Young: Trombone

Charts

References

1995 live albums
Earth, Wind & Fire live albums
Albums produced by Maurice White
Rhino Records live albums